CowParade is an international public art exhibit that has featured in major world cities. Fiberglass sculptures of cows are decorated by local artists, and distributed over the city centre, in public places such as train stations, important avenues, and parks. They often feature artwork and designs specific to local culture, as well as city life and other relevant themes.

After the exhibition in the city, which may last many months, the statues are auctioned off and the proceeds donated to charity.

There are a few variations of shape, but the three most common shapes of cow were created by Pascal Knapp, a Swiss-born sculptor who was commissioned to create the cows specifically for the CowParade series of events. Pascal Knapp owns the copyrights to the standing, lying, and grazing cow shapes used in the CowParade events.

History
The concept of "cow parade" has its origins in Zürich, Switzerland, in 1998 by artistic director Walter Knapp, it is based on an idea which was realised in the same city for the first time in 1986: lions as the symbol of Zurich were painted and then on display throughout the city.

The Zürich exhibit 1998 was not called "cow parade" - it was called Land in Sicht (roughly translated as "Countryside in view"). The concept was brought to the United States when Chicago businessman Peter Hanig, along with Commissioner of Cultural Affairs Lois Weisberg, organized an event in Chicago in 1999 called Cows on Parade. A Swiss company, CowHolding Parade AG, started to explore the idea. The American company capitalizing on this idea, CowHolding Parade, was founded in 1999; the Swiss company promptly sued but the case fizzled out without results. A bronze casting of one of the cows is on permanent display in Chicago in commemoration of the city's initial exhibition.

The success of this venture inspired many other cities to host similar fundraising projects. The idea has been taken up by other cities which have chosen animals for public art projects with painted fiberglass sculptures (e.g. Liverpool) (see Similar projects).

Cows

Some CowParade cities
 Chicago, Illinois, USA (1999)
 Bilbao, Spain (2001)
Ventspils, Latvia (2002)
 Buenos Aires, Argentina (2006)
 Houston, Texas, USA (2001)
 Kansas City, Missouri, USA (2001)
 Portland, Oregon, USA (2002)
 Manchester, England, UK (2004)
 Denver, Colorado, USA (2006)
 Toulouse, France (2012)
 Santa Catarina, Brazil (2011) visiting Blumenau, Camboriú, Florianópolis, Joinville, Rio Negrinho
 Harrisburg, Pennsylvania, USA (2004)
 Perth, Western Australia
 Mississauga, Ontario, Canada (2021)
 Toronto, Ontario, Canada (2022)

Similar projects

The phenomenon of CowParade has spawned copy-cat statue decorating projects in a number of cities worldwide.

Zürich itself has adapted the bear theme in the "Teddy-Summer" in 2005.

Elephant Parades

Elephant Parade is dedicated to saving the Asian elephant from extinction with auctioned off proceeds going to the Elephant Family organisation.

Buddy Bears

This adopts the Cowparade idea to Berlin's town mascot; however the entailing United Buddy Bears exhibitions are very different from all other urban events. The bears were created by the German artists Klaus and Eva Herlitz. The idea and the philosophy behind the United Buddy Bears exhibitions are unique: with its international approach and its symbolism, this synthesis of the arts globally promotes tolerance, international understanding and a peaceful coexistence.

Wild in Art
Since 2008 Wild in Art has created sculpture trails since 2008 from Aberdeen to Cape Town including events associated wth sporting events (2012 Olympics and 2014 Commonwealth Games).

Asia

Bat Yam "Masks", 2006–2007
Jerusalem, "Lions of Jerusalem", 2002
Tel Aviv, "Shvarim VeShe'arim" 2005, the Israeli stock market bull parade
Tel Aviv, "A Gateway to the World", 2007
Dubai, "Camel Caravan", 2003
Tokyo, "Totoro Comes to Town", 2021

Europe

{|class="wikitable sortable"
|-
!Location!!Name!!Exhibits!!Date
|-
|'s-Hertogenbosch      || Garden of Earthly Delights sculpture trail || Figures taken from the Hieronymus Bosch work The Garden of Earthly Delights
                           ||2016
|-
|Bath   ||King Bladud's Pigs||104 pigs
                           ||2008
|-
|Bath   ||Lions of Bath||100 lions
                           ||2010
|-
|Bristol               ||Shaun in the City      ||Shaun the Sheep visits Bristol in the summer 2015, after the spring 2015 visit to London. To coincide with Shaun the Sheep Movie.
                           || 2015
|-
|Bristol               ||Wow! Gorillas      ||61 gorillas 
                         || 2011
|-
|Colchester             ||Stand tall        ||112 giraffes
    ||2013
|-
|Dortmund              || ||120 winged rhinos||2005, expanded for 2006 FIFA World Cup
|-
|Glasgow               ||Clyde's Mascot Trail ||25 Clydes, the mascot of the 2014 Commonwealth Games||2014
|-
|Hamburg             ||Hans Hummel|| 100 Hans Hummel||2003
|-
|Hannover            ||Elefanten-Parade||45 elephants||2004'
|-
|Istanbul            ||Shoe Art||500 shoes||2008 September
|-
|Hull||Larkin with Toads||40 toads||2010
|-
|Kaiserslautern       ||Fishing for Phantasy||250 fish||2001
|-
|Leipzig              ||LeOLips||100 lions||2002
|-
|London               ||What's in your DNA? || 21 double helix sculptures including designed by Zaha Hadid, Orla Kiely and Ai Weiwei || June 29 – September 6, 2015
|-
|London               ||Shaun in the City      ||50 Shaun the Sheeps. Associated with a parade in Bristol in the summer 2015, and release of Shaun the Sheep Movie   || March 28 to May 25, 2015 
|-
|London           ||Budgie the Little Helicopter Comes to Town||||2021
|-
|London           ||The Big Egg Hunt||||2012
|-
|London           ||The Paddington Trail || 50 Paddington Bears || 2014
|-
|London           ||Tusk Rhino Trail ||21 rhinos||September 2018
|-
|Munich           ||Löwenparade|| 500 lions||2004
|-
|Neustadt an der Aisch||Aischgruender Karpfen||120 carp||2008 September 
|-
|Newport South Wales, UK||SuperDragons  ||60 dragons|| 2010
|-
|Northampton      ||Pride of Northampton||||2010
|-
|Norwich          ||Go Elephants||54 baby elephants||2008
|-
|Norwich          ||GoGoGorillas!||53 gorillas||2013
|-
|Paris            ||Pathé Roosters||50 roosters||2021
|-
|Sheffield        ||Herd of Sheffield||58 elephants||2016
|-
|Southampton      ||Go Rhinos!||rhinos||2013
|-
|Versmold         ||Bunte Borstenviecher ||120 pigs||2007
|-
|Wells         ||Swans of Wells ||60 swans||2012, to commemorate the Diamond Jubilee of Elizabeth II
|-
|Wolverhampton    ||Wolves in Wolves||30 wolves||5 July 5, 2017 - 24 September 2017
|-
|Wuppertal        ||Pinguinale||200 penguins||2006
|-
|Zürich           ||Teddy-Summer||630 teddy-bears||2005
|}

North America
Anaheim, California, baseball player Mickey Mouse, for the 2010 MLB All-Star Week
Anchorage, Alaska, "Wild Salmon on Parade" (2005)
Ann Arbor, Michigan, "Wolverines on Parade" (2023)
Atlanta, Georgia, "Dolphins on Parade" (2011) 
Austin, Texas, "GuitarTown" (2007) 
Baltimore, Maryland, "Crabtown Project" (2005) 
Baraboo, Wisconsin, "Bozo the Clown Comes to Town" (2021)
Bennington, Vermont, "Moosefest" (2005 & 2009) "PaletteFest" (2006)
Blacksburg, Virginia, "Gobble de Art" (2006)
Bloomington, Indiana "Brain Extravaganza" (2012) (22 fiberglass brains)
Boyertown, Pennsylvania, "Bear Fever"
Bradenton, Florida, "GECKOFest" (2006)
Brevard County, Florida "Shuttles Orbiting the Space Coast" (2009) 
Bucks County, Pennsylvania, "Miles of Mules"
Buffalo, New York, "Herd About Buffalo"
Cadiz, Kentucky, "Meet the Pigs of Cadiz, Kentucky"
Cairo, New York, "Bears and Butterflies" (2009–2011)
Calgary, Alberta, with lifesize cow statues, as a nod to the cattle industry in Alberta
Catskill, New York, "Cat-N-Around Catskill" (2007–2013)
Chestnut Hill, Philadelphia, Pennsylvania, "AbZOOlutely Chestnut Hill" (2006)
Chicago, "Horses of Honor" (2015),"Garfield Goose Comes to Town" (2022)
Cincinnati, Ohio, "Big Pig Gig"
Cleveland, Ohio, "GuitarMania" (2012) 
Crystal City, Virginia, "Crystal Flight" (2008)
Dallas, Texas, "Pegasus" (2001)
Detroit, Michigan, "Tigers on Parade" (2022)
Dothan, Alabama, "Peanuts Around Town" (2001) 
Edmonton, Alberta, Canada, "Bison" (2005)
El Segundo, California, "Matty Mattel Comes to Town" (2021)
Elkhart County, Indiana, "ElkArt on Parade" (2011)
Erie, Pennsylvania, "GoFish!" (2000), "LeapFrog" (2004)
Eugene, Oregon, "Ducks on Parade"
Flagstaff, Arizona "PAWS" (2009) 
Germantown, Tennessee "The Horses are Coming! The Horses are Coming!" (21 Horses) (2008)
Glendale, Ohio, Black Squirrels 
Glens Falls, New York, "Have a Seat" (Painted Chairs) (2011)
Gloucester County, Virginia, Beehives (2001)
Halifax, Nova Scotia, "Lobsters" (2005)
Hudson, New York, Dogs (2008 & 2009) (Since they're across the river from Catskill's Cats)
Iowa City, Iowa, "Herky on Parade" (2004) 
Jacksonville, Florida, "The Manatees of Jacksonville" (2005) 
Jasper, Alabama, "20-Mule Team Public Art Project" (2011)
Juneau, Alaska, "Whale Tail Trail" (2012) 
Langley, British Columbia "Horsing around Langley"
 Las Vegas, Nevada, "An Affair of the Art" (2013) 
Lexington, North Carolina, "Pigs in the City"
Los Angeles, California, "A Community of Angels"
Louisville, Kentucky, "Gallopalooza"
Memphis, Tennessee, "Tigers Around Town" (100 Tigers) (2011)
Miami, Florida, "Rooster Walk" (2003)
Mountain Towns of New York (Windham, Hunter, and surrounding areas), "Rip Lives" (Small concrete replicas of Rip Van Winkle) (2010-2012)
Naperville, Illinois, United Way hosts an annual exhibit (2001–2007) 
Nappanee, Indiana, "Apple-Picking" (2013) 
New Braunfels, Texas,"Stein Parade" (2006)
New York, New York, "MLB Statues On Parade" (June–July 2008)
New Orleans, Louisiana, "Paws on Parade" (2012)  "Festival of Fins" (2000) 
Norfolk, Virginia, (2000) "Mermaids on Parade,"
North Tonawanda, New York, "Carousel Horses on Parade" (2021)
Oklahoma, "Spirit of the Buffalo"
Ottawa, Ontario, tulips, at the Ottawa Tulip Festival 2005 in Major's Hill Park and at the Canadian National Exhibition Direct Energy Centre
Oxford, Maryland, "Take a Tour of Oxford's Picket Fences" (2009)
Park Ridge, Illinois, "Promise of Park Ridge" (2008) 
Pensacola, Florida, "Pelicans in Paradise"
Philadelphia, Pennsylvania, "Phanatic Around Town Project" (2010) 
Philadelphia, Pennsylvania, "Donkeys Around Town" (2016)
Pinecrest, Florida "SmARTy Dogs for Smart Schools" (2011) 
Pittsfield, Massachusetts, "Sheeptacular" (2004) 
Pittsburgh, Pennsylvania, "DINO-mite Days" (2000) 
Providence, Rhode Island, Mr Potato Head (2000)
Racine, Wisconsin, "Monumental Squares" (2014), "Summer Block Buster" (2013), "Summer Trunk Show" (2012), "Potsarazzi" (2011), "Hour Town" (2010), "Sunny and Chair" (2009), "Sphere Madness" (2008), "Lighten Up" (2007), "Bird is the Word" (2006), "Downtown Summer Splash" (2005), "Downtown Bears It All" (2004), "Cat'n Around Downtown" (2003), "Dog Days of Summer" (2002)
Richmond, Virginia, "Go Fish!" (2001)
Rochester, New York, "Horses on Parade" (2001) 
Salem, Oregon, "Salmon in the City" (2005)
Sarasota, Florida, "Superheroes on Parade, hosted by Southeastern Guide Dogs " (2016)
St. John's, Newfoundland and Labrador, "Mermaids in the City" (2006) 
St. Joseph, Michigan, "Lighting Up St. Joseph" (lighthouses, 2014), "All Aboard!" (2013), "Beached Pirates" (2012), "Barnyard at the Beach" (2011), "Hot Diggity Dogs" (2010), "Surf 'n Safari" (2009), "Boats-n-Beaches" (2008), "Hot Cars Cool Beaches" (2007), "Beach Bears" (2006), "Horses on the Beach" (2004, 2005)
St. Louis, "Cakeway to the West" (2014) 
Saint Paul, Minnesota "Snoopies" (2005)
San Francisco, California, "Hearts in San Francisco" (2004–2013)
San Jose, California, "SharkByte" (2001)
Santa Fe, New Mexico, "Trail of the Painted Ponies".
Santa Rosa, California, "Peanuts on Parade" (2005, 2006, 2007) 
Saratoga Springs, New York, "Horses, Saratoga Style" (2002, 2007) 
Saugerties, New York, "Hors'n Around Saugerties" (2009 & 2010);   "Shine On Saugerties (Lighthouses) (2011);   "Sittin' Around Saugerties (Chairs) (2012)
Seattle, Washington, "Pigs on Parade" (2001, 2007); "Ponies on Parade" (2004); "Nutcracker March" (2006) "Huskies on Parade" (2021)
Sedona, Arizona, "Javalinas on Parade" (2006) 
Toledo, Ohio, "It's Reigning Frogs" (2001); "Rockets on Parade" (2023)
Toronto, Ontario, "Moose in the City" (2000)
Troy, New York, "Uncle Sam Statues" (2013) - No Site Yet, announced on TV news
Tucson, Arizona, "Ponies del Pueblo"
Tulsa, Oklahoma, "Penguins on Parade" (2002); "Captain Cane Comes to Town" (2023)
Vancouver, British Columbia, "Orcas in the City" (2004); "Spirit Bears in the City" (2006); "Eagles in the City" (2009–2010); "Terracotta Warriors" (2012); "K.C. Bear's Travel" (2023)
 Vancouver, Washington, "HeArts of Clark County" (2013) 
Victoria, British Columbia, "Spirit Bears in the City" (multiple cities) (2005–2006); "Whales"
Virginia Beach, Virginia, "A Dolphin's Promise" (2005) 
Waco, Texas, "Bears on Parade" (2024)
Washington, D.C., "Party Animals";  "PandaMania", "Art in Bloom" (2021)
Willimantic, Connecticut, "FrogFest"
Wilmington, Vermont, Bears in the Valley (2007), VerMonsters (Recycled Object Art) (2008), Painted Adirondack Chairs (2010)
Winnipeg, Manitoba, Bears on Broadway (2005)

Criticism
CowParade has been criticized by contributing artists for their selectivity standards; David Lynch's cow with its flesh partially ripped off, and organs showing, was rejected. The explanation is that this particular CowParade cow was rejected by the City of New York, not the CowParade organisation.

A Swedish organization called The Militant Graffiti Artists of Stockholm kidnapped and decapitated one of the cows of the Stockholm event in protest of the publicly provisioned cows carrying advertisements.

See alsoBund BullCharging BullCool Globes: Hot Ideas for a Cooler PlanetConcrete Cows''
Elephant Parade
Gladys the Swiss Dairy Cow
The Big Egg Hunt
United Buddy Bears

References

External links

 Official U.S. CowParade website
 CowParade Rio de Janeiro 2007 — photos.
 Paris Cow Parade 2006 — photos.
 Carps in Neustadt an der Aisch (Germany) — photos.
 Wild in Art.uk

Animal sculptures
Cattle in art
Outdoor sculptures
Painted statue public art
Sculpture exhibitions
Sculptures of bovines